Jacques Martin may refer to:

Jacques Martin (pacifist) (1906–2001), French pacifist, conscientious objector and Protestant pastor; Righteous Among the Nations
Jacques Martin (ice hockey) (born 1952), hockey coach
Jacques Martin (athlete) (1959–2012), Canadian Paralympian
Jacques Martin (TV host) (1933–2007), French TV host and producer
Jacques Martin (comics) (1921–2010), French writer and artist of comics
Jacques Martin (cyclist) (1953-2004), Belgian cyclist

See also
Jacques-Paul Martin (1908–1992), French curial cardinal
Jack Martin (disambiguation)